Fish J. wrote a unanimous verdict for the Court, rejecting Crown contentions that the investigative procedure ought to be withheld from public view, in this case of insalubrious slaughter of cattle at the Aylmer Meat Packers plant in Toronto. In fact, the scandal that ensued had a part in changing the leadership of the province.

A justice of the peace had issued six search warrants for various locations linked to the Aylmer business.  The investigation by the Ontario Ministry of Natural Resources and the Canadian Food Inspection Agency on Sunday 23 August 2003 into the operation of Aylmer became the subject of widespread media reports five days after the execution of the warrants, after the following Wednesday Ontario public safety commissioner Dr. James Young told consumers not to eat any meat products from the Aylmer slaughterhouse.  The suitability for human consumption of meat slaughtered and processed by Aylmer became a matter of public concern.  The company was investigated for "possible offences involving the illegal processing of deadstock." Online records show that, as a result of the tainted meat scandal, company president Butch Clare pleaded guilty to distributing improperly labelled meat and received fines totalling $15,000.

Opinion of the Court

References

Canadian freedom of expression case law
Supreme Court of Canada cases
2005 in Canadian case law
Publication bans in Canadian case law
Health disasters in Canada
Food safety in Canada
Livestock